Leporinus torrenticola is a species of anostomid fish. It is endemic to Brazil and found in the middle Rio Xingu and its two major tributaries, the Rio Iriri and Rio Curuá, in the Pará state. This species can reach a length of  SL.

References

Anostomidae
Freshwater fish of Brazil
Endemic fauna of Brazil
Taxa named by José Luis Olivan Birindelli
Taxa named by Túlio Franco Teixeira
Taxa named by Heraldo Antonio Britski
Fish described in 2016